Penstemon angustifolius is a species of flowering plant in the plantain family known by the common names broadbeard beardtongue and narrowleaf beardtongue. It is native to the west-central United States, including the Great Plains.

This species is a perennial herb with thick, waxy, gray-green stems growing up to 24 inches tall. The flowers come in shades of pink and purple. The flowers attract hummingbirds.

This species grows on grasslands and in sandy habitat types, such as dunes. It is drought-tolerant.

This plant can be used in landscaping and as a garden plant in xeriscaping situations.

The Lakota people used the flowers to make blue dye for painting moccasins.

References

angustifolius
Flora of the United States